Sabine Schulze is a retired German swimmer who won a gold medal in the 4×100 m freestyle relay at the 1970 European Aquatics Championships, setting a new world record.

References

Living people
German female freestyle swimmers
Year of birth missing (living people)
Swimmers from Leipzig
World Aquatics Championships medalists in swimming
European Aquatics Championships medalists in swimming
20th-century German women